Kyustendil Ridge is a partly ice-free ridge rising to  on Nordenskjöld Coast in Graham Land, Antarctica. The ridge is bounded by Drygalski Glacier to the north, and Rogosh Glacier and Zlokuchene Glacier to the south. It is linked by Mrahori Saddle to Lovech Heights to the south.

The feature is named after the city of Kyustendil in western Bulgaria, and was given to the ridge by Bulgaria and originally in the Bulgarian language: Кюстендилски хребет, romanised as Kyustendilski Hrebet.

Location

Notes

References
 Kyustendil Ridge. SCAR Composite Antarctic Gazetteer
 Bulgarian Antarctic Gazetteer. Antarctic Place-names Commission. (details in Bulgarian, basic data in English)

External links
 Antarctic Digital Database (ADD). Scale 1:250000 topographic map of Antarctica. Scientific Committee on Antarctic Research (SCAR), 1993–2016.
 Kyustendil Ridge. Adjusted Copernix satellite image

Ridges of Graham Land
Nordenskjöld Coast
Bulgaria and the Antarctic
Kyustendil